Heartland Christian School is a private, Pre-K–12 christian school in Columbiana, Ohio. Athletic teams compete as the Heartland Christian Lions in the Ohio High School Athletic Association.

History
The school was founded by Rev. Cecil Jones, the pastor of the Columbiana Church of the Nazarene. Heartland was located in the Church of the Nazarene on Elm Street for four years as it grew from its original enrollment of 147 students to about 180 students. In July 2000, Heartland purchased the former Columbiana High School, and performed renovations on the school and gymnasium in 2001.

Academics

Secondary
The curriculum of grades 6–12, in addition to the standard mathematics, science, English, and social studies requirements, include a Bible class once a day and weekly chapel service, Advanced Placement courses in calculus AB and English language, foreign language, and ACT preparation. The secondary school offers a dual enrollment program where high school students take courses at Kent State University at Salem to earn college credits while they remain enrolled at the high school.

Athletics
The following is an alphabetical list of sports offered by the high school. 
Basketball
Baseball
Basketball
Bowling
Cross Country
Soccer
Golf
Track and field
Volleyball

Notes and references

High schools in Columbiana County, Ohio
Educational institutions established in 1996
Private high schools in Ohio
Private middle schools in Ohio
Private elementary schools in Ohio
1996 establishments in Ohio
Columbiana, Ohio